William King Lyon (7 March 1912 – 5 December 1962) was a Scottish professional footballer, who played for Queens Park and Celtic.

Career
Lyon began his senior career aged 21 with Queens Park after a spell with Kirkintilloch Rob Roy. He moved to Celtic in 1935. He was a centre-half in the era where that position was changing to an increasingly defensive role, and his attributes in that aspect saw him establish himself in the team ahead of other contenders. He was made captain of Celtic soon after joining the club, and went on to win the Scottish league championship in 1936 and 1938, the Scottish Cup in 1937 and the Empire Exhibition Trophy in 1938, as well as a Glasgow Cup and three Charity Cups.

He was never selected for the full Scotland international team (he was ineligible under rules of the time due to his English birthplace), but was a member of a SFA Touring XI squad which visited Canada and the US in 1939. He had also played twice for the Scottish League XI in 1938.

Lyon served in the Scots Guards during World War II, rising to the rank of major and sustaining a leg injury in 1944 which ended his football career. He was awarded the Military Cross.

His younger brother Tom was also a footballer; the pair were briefly teammates at Celtic when Tom joined as a guest player during the war.

References

External links
Profile and stats at AFC Heritage Trust

1912 births
1962 deaths
Celtic F.C. players
Scottish Football League players
Queen's Park F.C. players
Aberdeen F.C. wartime guest players
Scottish Junior Football Association players
Sportspeople from Clydebank
Footballers from West Dunbartonshire
Kirkintilloch Rob Roy F.C. players
Clydebank Juniors F.C. players
Association football central defenders
British Army personnel of World War II
Recipients of the Military Cross
Scots Guards officers
English footballers
Scottish Football League representative players
Anglo-Scots
Sportspeople from Birkenhead
Scotland wartime international footballers
Scotland junior international footballers